James Robert Stuart (July 2, 1919 – December 15, 1985) was an American football offensive lineman in the National Football League for the Washington Redskins.  He played college football at the University of Oregon and was drafted in the fifth round of the 1941 NFL Draft.

References

External links

1919 births
1985 deaths
American football offensive linemen
Oregon Ducks football players
People from Hermiston, Oregon
Washington Redskins players
Players of American football from Oregon